WAY-208466 is a potent and highly selective full agonist of the 5-HT6 receptor. It increases GABA levels in the cerebral cortex and tolerance does not appear to occur to this action upon chronic administration. Animal studies have shown that WAY-208466 produces antidepressant and anxiolytic effects in rodents and it may also be useful in the treatment of obsessive-compulsive disorder.

See also 
 WAY-181187

References 

5-HT6 agonists
Hydrazides
Pyrazines
Chloroarenes
Experimental drugs